Frederick Augustine Sterling (August 13, 1876 – April 21, 1957) was a United States diplomat. In 1927, he was the first person appointed US minister to the Irish Free State, a role he served in until 1934. He later served as US minister to Bulgaria and Sweden.

Biography
Sterling was born in St. Louis and was an 1898 graduate of Harvard University. After working on a ranch in Texas and manufacturing woolen goods, he became a career Foreign Service Officer in 1911. Assignments included work in Peru, China, Russia, and England.

In 1927, Sterling was the first person appointed US minister to the Irish Free State. After confirmation by the Senate, and presentation of his credentials to Irish leaders W. T. Cosgrave and Timothy Healy in July, he held the formal title of Envoy Extraordinary and Minister Plenipotentiary.

Sterling's post in Ireland ended in 1934, when he became US minister to Bulgaria, a position he remained in until 1936. In 1937, he was appointed to minister roles for both Latvia and Estonia, however he "did not proceed to post." In 1938, he became US minister to Sweden, and he remained in that role until 1941.

Sterling owned a summer house in Newport, Rhode Island; he was married, with two sons and one daughter. He died in Washington, D.C., in 1957, and is buried in Falls Church, Virginia.

References

External links
Frederick Augustine Sterling profile at history.state.gov

1876 births
1957 deaths
Ambassadors of the United States to Ireland
Ambassadors of the United States to Bulgaria
Ambassadors of the United States to Sweden
Harvard University alumni
United States Foreign Service personnel